Huling may refer to:

 Daniel Huling (born 1983), American steeplechase runner
 Dong Huling (1918–1992), Chinese t'ai chi ch'uan teacher
 James Hall Huling (1844–1918), American politician
 Lorraine Huling (1897–1971), American actress
 Thomas Byers Huling (1804–1865), American businessman
 Huling, China, a town in Zhejiang province

See also
 Hulings, a surname